Maksim Vladimirovich Igoshin (born 10 April 1978) is a Russian professional football manager and a former player. He is an assistant coach with FC Zenit Penza.

Club career
He played 3 seasons in the Russian Football National League for FC Chita and FC Zvezda Irkutsk.

References

External links
 

1978 births
Living people
Russian footballers
Association football defenders
FC Zvezda Irkutsk players
Russian football managers
FC Yenisey Krasnoyarsk players
FC Chita players
FC Volga Ulyanovsk players